Lužianky is a village and municipality in the Nitra District in western central Slovakia, in the Nitra Region.

History
In historical records the village was first mentioned in 1113.

Geography
The village lies at an altitude of 144 metres and covers an area of 12.426 km². It has a population of about 2535 people.

Ethnicity
The village is approximately 99% Slovak. 2 Brazilians

Facilities
The village has a public library a gym and football pitch.

References

External links
 
 
https://web.archive.org/web/20080111223415/http://www.statistics.sk/mosmis/eng/run.html

Villages and municipalities in Nitra District